Thabethe is a South African Zulu surname that may refer to the following notable people:

Elizabeth Thabethe (1959–2021), Deputy Minister of Tourism in South Africa
Nonkhululeko Thabethe (born 1992), South African cricketer
Thando Thabethe (born 1990), South African actress

Surnames of African origin